Lieutenant General Bakhodir Nizamovich Kurbanov is an Uzbek military leader who has served as the Minister of Defence of Uzbekistan since 2017.

Life and career 
He was born in late 1969 in the Jizzakh Region. From 1987-1989, he served in the Soviet Army. After the fall of the Soviet Union in 1991, Kurbanov enrolled in the Academy of the Ministry of Internal Affairs of Uzbekistan, of which he graduated from in 1994. In December 2013, Kurbanov was appointed to the post of Deputy Minister of Internal Affairs of Uzbekistan. n 2015, Colonel Kurbanov was appointed as Head of the Main Department of Internal Affairs of the City of Tashkent. In the years that followed, he served in various positions in the internal services and military units of the armed forces, such as Commander of the Tashkent Military District.

Defence minister 
On 11 February 2019, Kurbanov was appointed as Minister of Defense, replacing Lieutenant General Abdusalom Azizov, who was transferred to the National Security Service. One of his first actions as defence minister was to chair a conference of the Chiefs of Defence of the militaries of Central Asia, as well as the Commander of the United States Central Command Joseph Votel. Since 15 August 2020, he has concurrently been the Chairman of the Mixed Martial Arts Association (MMA) of Uzbekistan.

See also 
 Ministry of Defense (Uzbekistan)
 Armed Forces of the Republic of Uzbekistan

References 

Uzbekistani politicians
Uzbekistani military personnel
Defence Ministers of Uzbekistan
People from Jizzakh Region
Living people
1969 births